Lunana Gewog is a gewog (village block) of Gasa District, Bhutan. The village Lunana is the administrative center of Lunana Gewog. 

The gewog lies almost entirely within protected areas, mostly in Jigme Dorji National Park, though eastern sections are part of Wangchuck Centennial Park. Lunana contains many of Bhutan's glaciers.

In addition to the national language, Dzongkha, many locals speak Lunanakha.

The closure of the Tibetan border following the Chinese invasion of Tibet brought changes to neighboring areas, as refugees from Tibet arrived with their yaks, which they sold off at low prices. However, because there were no direct routes into Lunana from Tibet, yaks were brought into Lunana from Laya and Sephu in Wangdue Phodrang District. Taxes on horses and yaks, which had been a disincentive to livestock production were reduced, and yak production increased.

References 

Gewogs of Bhutan
Gasa District